Actinoporus is a genus of sea anemones of family Aurelianidae. It comprises the following species:
Actinoporus elegans
Actinoporus elongatus

References 

Capneidae
Hexacorallia genera